Television in Cyprus was introduced in 1956. In 1957, CyBC was created. Private TV was introduced on 26 April 1992, by Logos TV which started its transmissions in stereo and Teletext from day one. The first private TV station of Cyprus was owned and operated by the Church of Cyprus. In August 1995, the same station introduced the first internet service provider in Cyprus, LOGOSNET. The Republic of Cyprus currently uses the PAL colour system and has converted terrestrial transmissions to digital on 1 July 2011, in line with EU policy. Because of the political division of the island, television companies are also divided.

Republic of Cyprus
Terrestrial digital transmission is now available in Cyprus (parallel analogue transmissions ended finally on 1 July 2011). Satellite digital transmission is available through Nova platform. Athina Sat, another provider, was launched in May 2005 but ceased operations in 2008. CytaVision and PrimeTel both offer digital TV through IPTV transmission and Cablenet through its privately owned cable network (in certain urban areas).

Free-to-air

Public Stations
CyBC 1 (Aglandjia)
CyBC 2 (Aglandjia)
CyBC HD (Aglandjia)
ERT News (Agia Paraskevi)
ERT World (Agia Paraskevi)

Private Channels
Alpha TV Cyprus (Latsia)
ANT1 Cyprus (Strovolos)
Capital TV (Limassol)
Extra Cyprus (Limassol)
Omega TV Cyprus (Nicosia)
Plus (Limassol and Engomi)
Sigma TV (Strovolos)
Smile TV Cyprus (Zakaki)
Vergina (Nicosia and Limassol)

The private channels ANT1 Cyprus, Plus TV, Omega, Sigma and New Extra formed Velister which carries their digital programming. It's expected that Velister will be covering the whole south region of Cyprus before the analogue switch off on 1 July 2011. Reception of free to air digital channels varies across the country.

Pay TV

Platforms
Cablenet (Engomi)
CytaVision (Strovolos)
Epic TV (Nicosia)
NOVA Cyprus (Nicosia)
PrimeTel (Limassol)

Channels
Cablenet Cinema (Engomi)
CytaVision Sports (Strovolos)
Greek Cinema (Strovolos)
Movies Best (Nicosia)
PrimeTel HDTV (Limassol)
Village Cinema (Strovolos)

Others
BFBS
ERT World
Euronews
CyBC Sat

References

External links
MAVISE - TV market in Cyprus
Digital TV Cyprus

Television in Cyprus